Bang Camaro is an American hard rock band from Boston, Massachusetts. Founded by guitarists Bryn Bennett and Alex Necochea in 2005, it is composed of members of various indie rock bands from the area. In 2009, the group is signed with Black Sword Records, 8th Impression Music, and Fontana/Universal.

Musical style and influences
The band is composed of a bassist, a drummer, two guitarists, and a lead singer complement drawing from a pool of eight to twelve vocalists. The basic song structure highlights catchy choruses and integrates frequent guitar solos.

The band cites as influences Elvis Presley and Buddy Holly, plus metal bands such as Iron Maiden, Skid Row, Def Leppard, and Dokken. Discussing their anthem rock style, band member Alex Necochea said, "We're really not heavy metal. I think our focus is more on writing great singles, as best as we can make them. That's just something Bryn and I grew up on. We're big fans of melody and big driving hooks, that sort of thing."

Band members

Current members
Alex Necochea – rhythm guitar, lead guitar
Bryn Bennett – lead guitar
Dave "Doz" Riley – bass guitar, synthesizers
Mike Piehl – drums
Rodrigo Van Stoli – vocals
Morgan Brown – vocals
Nick Given – vocals
Steve Trombley – vocals
Mike Soltoff – vocals
Jay Marsh – vocals
Michelle Yvette Paulhus – vocals
Kate Murdoch – vocals
Melissa Gibbs – vocals
Mike Nastri – vocals
Tad Mckitterick – vocals
John Brookhouse – vocals

Past members
Maclaine Diemer – guitar, keyboards
Mike Oor – guitar
Seth Kasper – drums
Peter McCarthy – drums
Charlotte Anne Dole – drums
Dylan Halacy – drums
Richie Hoss – vocals
Glen Fant – vocals
Zach Given – vocals
Jake Given – vocals
Jay Clifford – vocals
Andre Coles – vocals
Dick Valentine – vocals

Graeme Hall – vocals
Sean Barry – vocals
Keith Wales – vocals
James Fant – vocals
Justin Buckley – vocals
Max Heinegg – vocals
Mike McKay – vocals
Nate Wells – vocals
Robb Waters – vocals
Christopher Pappas – vocals
Jim Sargent – vocals

Discography
Albums
Bang Camaro (2007)
Bang Camaro II (2008)

Singles
Too Fast to Fall in Love (2022)
We Know You Know (2023)

Compilations
From Toronto with Love (Virgin Mobile Festival compilation) (2007) – features a live version of "Out on the Streets," which was recorded at the Bang Camaro album release show at Paradise Rock Club in Boston, MA in February 2007.
Tankfarm Presents: Future Sounds 26 - Song unknown.

Television 
In 2022 Bang Camaro's song "Push Push (Lady Lightning)" was featured in the promotional teaser for the HBO show The Peacemaker, and also appeared in Episode 3: Better Goff Dead.

Additional member affiliations

 Alex Necochea was a member of The Gasolines, The Good North, The Vershok, and has performed with Bleu, Vic Firecracker, Max Heinegg & the Nervous, and The SnowLeopards. He is currently a member of Township, Devil on Horseback, and Worshipper.
 Bryn Bennett was a member of the bands The Model Sons and Reverse.
 Dave "Doz" Riley was a member of the Good North and is currently a member of Devil on Horseback.
 Morgan Brown was a content designer and Bryn Bennett was a programmer at Iron Lore Entertainment, developers of Titan Quest, for which the song "Rock of Mages" was written.
 Nick Given was in The Vershok and Men of Seas.
 Steve Trombley was in The Vershok, Men of Seas, and I am Become Death, and is in No Nations.
 Rod Van Stoli is in OfficerX and the Aquanutz.
 Mike Soltoff was in Rule and is in The White Belts and Midnight Goggles.
 Jay Marsh was in Taxpayer and is in Blood Built Empire.
 Michelle Yvette Paulhus is in the Aquanutz, Stars Like Ours, and Band of Their Own.
 Melissa Gibbs is in the Aquanutz, the Andrea Gillis Band, The Loyal Seas, and Band of Their Own.
 Tad Mckitterick is in Sidewalk Driver.
 Kate Murdoch is in Sidewalk Driver.
 John Brookhouse was in Rule and is in Worshipper.
 Glen Fant was in The Distinguished Members and is in The Fatal Flaw and Recent History.
 Richie Hoss was in the bands Noble Rot and Duck and Cover.
 Andre Coles, also known as BoyWonder, is a Philadelphia-based musician.
 Pete McCarthy was in The Vershok and Men of Seas.
 Dick Valentine is the lead singer of Detroit, MI-based alternative rock band, Electric Six.
 Maclaine was in Taxpayer, performed with Bleu and was co-host of the podcast from grouphug.us called Audiocrush, and was a sound designer at ArenaNet on Guild Wars 2.
 Seth Kasper was in Hooray For Earth and New York City-based experimental music group Zambri.
 Dylan Halacy performed with Bleu, Angels Fall, and Red Circle Underground, with actors Cassie Steele (Degrassi: The Next Generation) and Harold Perrineau (Lost), and It's Always Sunny In Philadelphia touring production, The Nightman Cometh Live.
 Michael Oor was lead guitarist for The SnowLeopards, and bassist for Runner & the Thermodynamics. Currently guitarist in Micronians (Los Angeles)
 Charlotte Anne Dole was drummer for The Bon Savants, Mystery Roar, and Cymbals Eat Guitars, and is in the Indie Drummer Collective, Empty Country, Cult Objects, and Willy Mason.
 Jake Given is a game designer at Lay Waste Games, makers of Dragoon.
 Zach Given is a game designer at Lay Waste Games, makers of Dragoon.
 Max Heinegg has a solo musical career.
 Graeme Hall was in Moki, Ther Vershok, and Men of Seas.
 James Fant was in The Distinguished Members.
 Keith Wales was in St. Helena.
 Mike McKay is also known as Boston-based DJ Mistaker.
 Christopher Pappas is in The Everyday Visuals.
 Jim Sargent is in The Everyday Visuals.

References

External links
Official website

2005 establishments in Massachusetts
Glam metal musical groups from Massachusetts
Hard rock musical groups from Massachusetts
Heavy metal musical groups from Massachusetts
Musical groups established in 2005
Musical groups from Boston